Ogden is a census-designated place (CDP) in New Hanover County, North Carolina, United States. It is both a suburb of the city of Wilmington and part of the Wilmington Metropolitan Statistical Area. The population was 6,766 at the 2010 census, up from 5,481 in 2000.

Recent developments
A Census-designated place north of Wilmington, Ogden has become increasingly developed and populated since the late 1990s. This development was furthered by Ogden's location between the luxurious residential communities of Porter's Neck to the north, Middle Sound Loop in the middle, and Landfall to the south. Ogden is also fairly close to Figure Eight Island, an island community north of Wrightsville Beach. The Ogden area currently contains several grocery stores, including two Harris Teeters, drug stores, and many well reputed restaurants.

Geography
Ogden is located at  (34.265169, -77.799188).

Demographics

2020 census

As of the 2020 United States census, there were 8,200 people, 3,067 households, and 2,277 families residing in the CDP.

2000 census
As of the census of 2000, there were 5,481 people, 2,133 households, and 1,623 families residing in the CDP. The population density was 1,178.4 people per square mile (455.1/km). There were 2,270 housing units at an average density of 488.1 per square mile (188.5/km). The racial makeup of the CDP was 96.57% White, 1.48% African American, 0.24% Native American, 0.60% Asian, 0.26% from other races, and 0.86% from two or more races. Hispanic or Latino of any race were 1.17% of the population.

There were 2,133 households, out of which 37.0% had children under the age of 18 living with them, 67.7% were married couples living together, 6.4% had a female householder with no husband present, and 23.9% were non-families. 18.1% of all households were made up of individuals, and 5.3% had someone living alone who was 65 years of age or older. The average household size was 2.57 and the average family size was 2.93.

In the CDP, the population was spread out, with 25.2% under the age of 18, 5.2% from 18 to 24, 32.0% from 25 to 44, 27.8% from 45 to 64, and 9.8% who were 65 years of age or older. The median age was 39 years. For every 100 females, there were 98.7 males. For every 100 females age 18 and over, there were 97.3 males.

The median income for a household in the CDP was $61,684, and the median income for a family was $73,750. Males had a median income of $45,878 versus $31,404 for females. The per capita income for the CDP was $28,741. About 3.5% of families and 5.8% of the population were below the poverty line, including 6.4% of those under age 18 and 3.5% of those age 65 or over.

References

Census-designated places in North Carolina
Census-designated places in New Hanover County, North Carolina
Cape Fear (region)